Yuntai Road is a station on Line 7 of the Shanghai Metro. It was one of the stations located in the Shanghai Expo 2010 zone.

Railway stations in Shanghai
Shanghai Metro stations in Pudong
Line 7, Shanghai Metro
Railway stations in China opened in 2009